Kali turgidum (synonym Salsola kali subsp. kali), commonly known as prickly saltwort or prickly glasswort, is an annual plant that grows in salty sandy coastal soils.

Its distributional range is in Europe along the shores of Baltic Sea, North Sea and the Atlantic Ocean.  In the Mediterranean and at dry inland places it is replaced by Kali tragus (syn. Salsola tragus or Salsola kali subsp. tragus), which is less tolerant to salty soils, and has spread from Eurasia to other continents. Kali turgidum does not seem to occur as an introduced species in America.

Systematics 
The species was first described in 1753 as Salsola kali by Carl Linnaeus in Species Plantarum. Until 2007, it belonged to genus Salsola (sensu lato), but after molecular genetical research, this genus was split, and the species was placed into genus Kali Mill. (Syn.: Salsola sect. Kali Dum.). In genus Kali, the valid name is Kali turgidum (Dumort.) Guterm. (incorrectly as "turgida", Basionym: Salsola turgida Dumort., Fl. Belgica 23, 1827). The name Kali soda Moench used by Akhani et al. (2007) is invalid because of the older name Kali soda Scop. (a synonym of Salsola soda).

Kali turgidum belongs to tribe Salsoleae s. str. Kali turgidum, Kali tragus, and other closely related species form a species complex (Kali tragus-aggregate or formerly Salsola kali-aggregate). Some authors treat these species only on subspecies level. Then Kali tragus would be the valid name for the whole species complex, and Kali turgidum would be a subspecies of it.

In 2014, Mosyakin et al. proposed to conserve Salsola kali (= Kali turgidum) as nomenclatoral type for the genus Salsola. If the proposal will be accepted, all species of genus Kali would belong to Salsola again.

Alkali and soda ash 
The plant is a halophyte, i.e. it grows where the water is salty, and the plant is a succulent, i.e. it holds much salty water. When the plant is burned, the sodium in the salt ends up in the chemical sodium carbonate. Sodium carbonate has a number of practical uses, including especially as an ingredient in making glass, and making soap. In the medieval and early modern centuries the Kali plant and others like it were collected at tidal marshes and seashores. The collected plants were burned. The resulting ashes were mixed with water. Sodium carbonate is soluble in water. Non-soluble components of the ashes sunk to the bottom of the water container. The water with the sodium carbonate dissolved in it was then transferred to another container, and then the water was evaporated off, leaving behind the sodium carbonate. Another major component of the ashes that is soluble in water is potassium carbonate. The resulting product consisted mainly of a mixture of sodium carbonate and potassium carbonate. This product was called "soda ash" (was also called "alkali"). Soda ash extracted from the ashes of Kali turgidum/Kali tragus contains as much as 30% sodium carbonate. The soda ash was used primarily to make glass (secondly used as a cleaning agent). Another notable halophilic plant that was collected for the purpose was Salsola soda. Another was Halogeton sativus. Historically in the late medieval and early post-medieval centuries the word "Kali" could refer to any such plants. (The words "alkali" and "kali" come from the Arabic word for soda ash, al-qali). Today such plants are also called saltworts, referring to their relatively high salt content. Because of their use historically in making glass, they are also called glassworts. In Spain the saltwort plants were called barilla and were the basis of a large industry in Spain in the 18th century; see barilla. In the early 19th century, plant sources were supplanted by synthetic sodium carbonate produced using the Leblanc process.

See also 

 Prickly Russian thistle
 Russian globe thistle
 Salsola
 Tumbleweed

References

Amaranthaceae
Halophytes
Plants described in 1753
Taxa named by Carl Linnaeus
Barilla plants